Charles Michel, Marquis de Villette (4 December 1736 – 7 July 1793) was a French writer and politician.

Life

Voltaire's protégé
Charles was born in Paris as the heir of a financier who left him a large fortune and the nobility title of Marquis.  After taking part in the Seven Years' War, Villette returned in 1763 to his native city, where he owned an estate in Clermont.  The Marquis made many enemies by his perceived lack of manners. Nonetheless, he succeeded in gaining the intimacy of Voltaire, who had known his mother and who wished to turn him into a poet; the aging philosophe is even recorded to have viewed his protégé Villette as "the French Tibullus".

In 1765, Voltaire invited the Marquis to his estate at Ferney.  Although Voltaire joked quite freely about the Marquis' illegal attractions to men, he convinced the Marquis to marry Reine Philiberte de Varicourt in 1777.  The marriage was unhappy, and his wife was subsequently adopted by Voltaire's niece, Marie Louise Mignot.  Both Charles and Philiberte remained devoted to Voltaire, however, and it was at their home in Paris that Voltaire died in 1778.  Villette kept Voltaire's heart in an urn.

Revolution
During the French Revolution, Villette publicly burned his , wrote revolutionary articles in the Chronique de Paris, and put forth the proposal that Louis XVI of France should be stripped of most power but maintained as head of state. In the rain of pamphlets which followed this advice, much was made of Villette's attraction to men. One pamphleteer vulgarized him as a man "unnatural" in all things.  Another claimed that his own pamphlet, Les Enfants de Sodome à l'Assemblée Nationale, ou Députation de l'Ordre de la Manchette aux représentants de tous les ordres, actually came from the house of Villette, who was named as Grand Commander of an order of male lovers in this mocking call for gay rights.  The attacks were answered on Villette's behalf by his illustrious friend, Anacharsis Cloots, a Dutchman hailed as "the Spokesman for the Human Race".

Villette was elected deputy to the National Convention by the départment of Seine-et-Oise in 1792. He had the courage to condemn the September Massacres and to vote for the imprisonment only, and not for the death penalty, of Louis XVI (December 1792). He died in Paris the next year, and his seat in the Convention was taken by Antoine-Augustin Auger.

Works
In 1784 he published his Œuvres, and in 1792 his articles in the Chronique de Paris appeared in book form under the title Lettres choisies sur les principaux événements de la Révolution.

References

External links
 Philosophe letters: Le marquis de Villette, August 1765

1736 births
1793 deaths
18th-century LGBT people
Deputies to the French National Convention
Gay politicians
French journalists
French poets
French gay writers
LGBT legislators in France
Marquesses of Vilette
LGBT nobility
Writers from Paris
Voltaire
French LGBT poets
French male essayists